James Laurence "Larry" McGinnis (July 16, 1899 – March 21, 1948) was a guard in the National Football League. He played two seasons with the Milwaukee Badgers.

References

1899 births
1948 deaths
Sportspeople from Topeka, Kansas
Players of American football from Kansas
Milwaukee Badgers players
American football offensive guards
Marquette Golden Avalanche football players
Washburn Ichabods football players